Milton Gaither is an historian of education and a professor at Messiah College. Some of his most notable works include American Educational History Revisited, on the historiography of American education, and Homeschool: An American History.

Early life 

Gaither received a bachelor's degree from Wheaton College in 1990 in philosophy and literature, a Master of Arts in Religion from the Yale Divinity School in 1996 in church history and classical languages, and a Ph.D. in the history of American education from Indiana University Bloomington in 2000.

References

External links 

 Faculty directory profile at Messiah College

American historians of education
Homeschooling in the United States
Messiah University
Indiana University Bloomington alumni
Wheaton College (Illinois) alumni
Yale Divinity School alumni
Year of birth missing (living people)
Living people